State Highway 2 (SH-2) is a state highway in Bihar state. It covers only one districts i.e. Patna district of Bihar state. This state highway starts from Raghopur village near Bihta and ends at NH-139 near Mahabali Pur village. 

Mahabali Pur is situated 8 km, west of Paliganj. In Bihar, it is known as Bikram-Bihta Road.

Route
The route of SH-2 from north to south is as follows:

 Raghopur (Bihta)
 Datiyana
 Bikram
 Dulhin Bazar
 Paliganj (SH-69 junction)
 Mahabali Pur (NH-139 junction)
 Sone River

References 

State Highways in Bihar